Canberra Chill is an Australian hockey club based in Canberra, Australian Capital Territory. The club was established in 2019, and is one of 7 established to compete in Hockey Australia's new premier domestic competition, Hockey One.

The club unifies both men and women under one name, unlike the Australian Capital Territory's former representation in the Australian Hockey League as the Canberra Lakers (men) and Canberra Strikers (women).

Canberra Chill will compete for the first time in the inaugural season of Hockey One, which will be contested from late September through to mid November 2019.

History
Canberra Chill, along with six other teams, was founded on 17 April 2019 as part of Hockey Australia's development of hockey.

The club uniform and colours are based around the ACT flag, comprising mainly yellow and blue.

Home stadium
Canberra Chill are based out of the National Hockey Centre in the Australian Capital Territory, and Australia's capital city, Canberra. The stadium has a capacity of approximately 2,000 spectators.

Throughout the Hockey One league, Canberra Chill will play a number of home games at the stadium.

Teams

Team
The Men's team was announced on 30 August 2022, via Canberra Chill's official Instagram page.

David Atkin
Andrew Charter (GK)
Garry Backhaus 
Owen Chivers
Ben Craig
James Day
Hayden Dillion
Anand Gupte
Jamie Hawke
Brendan Hill (GK)
Glenn Turner
Aiden Dooley
Jeremy Hopkins
Jay MacDonald
Oscar Smart
Conner Tuddenham
Lewis Shepherd
Ben Staines
Jake Staines
Sean Baker

Women's team
The women's team was announced on 30 August 2022, via Canberra Chill's official Instagram page.

Catriona Bailey-Price
Edwina Bone
Emily Robson 
Kalindi Commerford
Laura Gray
Mikayla Evans
Naomi Evans
Asta Johnson
Steff Kindon 
Sophie Gaughan
Isabell Lovell
Lauren Yee
Olivia Martin
Mikaela Patterson
Shihori Oikawa
Riley Smith
Steff Kindon
Sarah White
[[Katie Doar]]
<li value=20>[[Madison Doar]]
{{div col end}}

References
{{reflist}}

{{Canberra Sports Teams}}

[[Category:Australian field hockey clubs]]
[[Category:Sporting clubs in Canberra|Chill]]
[[Category:Field hockey clubs established in 2019]]
[[Category:2019 establishments in Australia]]
[[Category:Hockey One]]